The Cooper Landing Post Office, formerly known as Jack Lean's Store, is a historic building located in the town of Cooper Landing, Kenai Peninsula Borough, Alaska. Cooper Landing was established after prospector Joseph Cooper discovered gold in the 1880s where the Kenai River meets Kenai Lake.  The chalet-style building was built c. 1910-20 as a simple log cabin, and was enlarged in the 1920s and 1930s, probably not acquiring its distinctive facade until the 1930s.  Its facade is adorned with hunting trophies such as caribou and moose antlers. The building has been relocated a short distance to the west, along with the historical Ridderford School, and is now part of the Cooper Landing Historical Museum.

The building was listed on the National Register of Historic Places in 1978.

See also 

National Register of Historic Places listings in Kenai Peninsula Borough, Alaska
List of United States post offices

References

External References
Cooper Landing Museum

Government buildings completed in 1921
Log cabins in the United States
Buildings and structures on the National Register of Historic Places in Kenai Peninsula Borough, Alaska
Post office buildings on the National Register of Historic Places in Alaska
Historic district contributing properties in Alaska
Log buildings and structures on the National Register of Historic Places in Alaska